Deepak Thankappan Nair (born 25 October 1973) is an Indian Structural Biologist and a scientist at Regional Centre for Biotechnology. He is known for his studies on DNA and RNA polymerases. Deepak was a Ramanujan fellow of the Science and Engineering Research Board (2008–2013) and a recipient of the National BioScience Award for Career Development (Dept. of Biotechnology). The Council of Scientific and Industrial Research, the apex agency of the Government of India for scientific research, awarded him the Shanti Swarup Bhatnagar Prize for Science and Technology, one of the highest Indian science awards, for his contributions to biological sciences in 2017.

Biography 

His parents are from the southern state of Kerala and he was born in Pune in the western state of Maharashtra on 25 October 1973, Deepak Nair went to school at the Jai Hind High School (Pimpri) and then later to the St. Vincents Junior College (Pune). He graduated with BSc in Chemistry from Fergusson College (1994) and completed his Masters in Biotechnology from the Savitribai Phule Pune University (1996). Subsequently, he enrolled for his doctoral studies at the National Institute of Immunology, India to secure a PhD in structural immunology in 2001. For his PhD he worked under the supervision of Dr. Dinakar Mashnu Salunke. Later, he moved to the US to complete his post-doctoral work in the laboratory of Prof. Aneel K. Aggarwal at the Mount Sinai Medical Center. He returned to India in 2007 to take up the position of an independent investigator at the National Centre for Biological Sciences . He worked in NCBS as Reader-F (2007–2013) and Associate Professor (2013–2014). In July 2014, he joined the Regional Centre for Biotechnology as an Associate professor, and was promoted to the position of Professor in July 2019.

Research 
Deepak Nair has obtained new insight regarding the molecular mechanisms that determine the fidelity of the replication process in bacteria and flaviviruses. His laboratory has shed new light on the strategy utilized by DNA polymerases to prevent ribonucleotide incorporation (NAR, 2019, 47:10693). In 2018, his laboratory showed that pyrophosphate hydrolysis is an intrinsic and critical step in the DNA synthesis reaction catalyzed by DNA polymerases and this discovery was accorded breakthrough status by the journal Nucleic Acids Chemistry (NAR, 2018, 46:5875). Regarding the piggyBac transposase, his laboratory has shown that the dimerization through the Ring Finger Domain present at the C-terminus attenuates the excision activity of this enzyme (Biochemistry, 2018, 57:2913).  He has discovered the mechanism employed by DNA polymerase IV to rescue replication stalled at damaged nucleotides with unprecedented efficiency and accuracy (Structure, 2014, 23:56–67). Nair has provided insight into how specialized DNA polymerases that participate in adaptive mutagenesis ensure achieve function (Nucleic Acids Research, 2013, 41:5104–5014; Acta Crystallogr D Biol Crystallogr. 2012 68:960-7, J Nucleic Acids. 2012:285481). His laboratory has shown how GTP binding to the viral RNA-dependent-RNA polymerase ensures accurate initiation of replication of the viral genome (Nucleic Acids Research, 2014, 42:2758–2573). In addition, he has shown that reactive oxygen species do play an important role in the antimicrobial activity of bactericidal antibiotics (Angew Chem Int Ed Engl. 2016 55:2397-400). In collaboration with D. N. Rao (Department of Biochemistry, IISc), his laboratory has also contributed towards understanding how proteins involved in the post-replicative repair of DNA mismatches function (Nucleic Acids Research, 2018, 46:256–266; PLoS One. 2010, 5:e13726). His laboratory has shown that the proofreading domain of the Pfprex DNA polymerase from Plasmodium falciparum is capable of removing misincorporated oxidized nucleotides from the primer (Sci Rep. 2020,10(1):11157) and translesion DNA synthesis past common oxidized template nucleotides (FEBS J., 2022 289:5218). Recently his laboratory has helped in the characterization of a monoclonal antibody that can neutralize different Variants-of-Concern of the SARS-CoV-2 virus (PLoS Pathog., 2022,18(12):e1010994). Using computational tools his laboratory has also identified possible inhibitors of the RNA-dependent-RNA polymerase (IUBMB Life., 2020, 72:2112) and proofreading exoribonuclease from SARS-CoV-2 (Int J Biol Macromol.,2021,168:272). So far, he has been centrally involved in the deposition of 76 entries in the protein data bank, which is a repository of three-dimensional structures of biological macromolecules.  

As a post-doctoral fellow (Dec 2001– July 2007) he focused on understanding the structural basis of DNA lesion bypass by eukaryotic Y-family DNA polymerases using X-ray crystallography. Due to the action of a variety of agents, lesions are formed on DNA which interferes with normal replication and may also prove carcinogenic. Eukaryotes possess up to four specialized DNA polymerases that are able to synthesize DNA across these lesions and thus prevent the replication fork from stalling. Nair determined the crystal structure of the catalytic cores of two such polymerases, human DNA polymerase iota (hPolι) and yeast REV1 (yREV1) –in complex with DNA and incoming nucleotide. The structures of hPolι and yRev1 in complex with undamaged and damaged DNA has shown that these two polymerases prefer altered modes of base-pairing in the active site to facilitate lesion bypass (Nature, 2004, 430:377; Science, 2005, 309:2219; Structure, 2005, 13:1569; Structure, 2006, 14:749; Nat. Struct. Mol. Biol., 2006, 13:619; Structure, 2008, 16:239; Structure, 2009, 17:530). Both hPolι and yREV1 have unique active sites that facilitate the formation of non-Watson-Crick base pairs to achieve lesion bypass and rescue stalled replication. He also played a role in the determination of the structure of a third Y-family polymerase human DNA Polymerase kappa in its functional state (Mol. Cell, 2007, 25:601).  In addition, he also participated in projects aimed at understanding the nature of interactions between the translational regulator Pumilio and non-cognate RNA targets (Structure, 2008, 16:549) and discerning the preference of hPolι for incorporating dGTP when the base of the templating nucleotide is thymine (Structure, 2009, 17:974).

His doctoral thesis (July 1996 – Dec 2001) describes the crystallographic analysis of a panel of three murine monoclonal antibodies raised against the same promiscuous peptide antigen PS1 (HQLDPAFGANSTNPD). (J Immunol, 2000, 165:6949; J. Immunol, 2002, 168:2371). The comparison of the structure of the antibodies in their bound and unbound state suggests there could be a convergence of both epitope and paratope conformations in an antibody response against a flexible immunodominant epitope (J. Immunol, 2002, 168:2371). He also carried out a computational analysis of the conformational propensities of native and retro-inverso versions of B-cell and T-cell epitopes (J. Immunol, 2003, 170:1362). This study showed that conformational and functional mimicry can be achieved through retro-inversion only if the native peptide is present in a linear extended conformation in its functional state. He was also involved in the structure determination of an antibacterial protein from tasar silkworm Antheraea mylitta (J. Biol. Chem., 2001, 276:41377). In addition, he modeled the complex of the ribonuclease restriction and its rRNA substrate (Biochemistry, 2001, 40:9115).

Awards and honors 
Deepak T. Nair was selected for the Ramanujan Fellowship by the Department of Biotechnology for the period 2008–2013,. He became a member of the Guha Research Conference in 2013. He received the National Bioscience Award for Career Development (N-BIOS Prize) in 2014. The Council of Scientific and Industrial Research awarded him the Shanti Swarup Bhatnagar Prize, one of the highest Indian science awards in 2017. He was inducted as a fellow of the Indian National Science Academy (New Delhi, India) in December, 2022.

Publications 

 Parray HA, Narayanan N, Garg S, Rizvi ZA, Shrivastava T, Kushwaha S, Singh J, Murugavelu P, Anantharaj A, Mehdi F, Raj N, Singh S, Dandotiya J, Lukose A, Jamwal D, Kumar S, Chiranjivi AK, Dhyani S, Mishra N, Kumar S, Jakhar K, Sonar S, Panchal AK, Tripathy MR, Chowdhury SR, Ahmed S, Samal S, Mani S, Bhattacharyya S, Das S, Sinha S, Luthra K, Batra G, Sehgal D, Medigeshi GR, Sharma C, Awasthi A, Garg PK, Nair DT, Kumar R. A broadly neutralizing monoclonal antibody overcomes the mutational landscape of emerging SARS-CoV-2 variants of concern. PLoS Pathog. 2022 Dec 12;18(12):e1010994. doi: 10.1371/journal.ppat.1010994. PMID: 36508467; PMCID: PMC9779650.
 Jaiswal D, Verma S, Nair DT, Salunke DM. Antibody multispecificity: A necessary evil? Mol Immunol. 2022 Dec;152:153-161. doi: 10.1016/j.molimm.2022.10.012. Epub 2022 Nov 8. PMID: 36368122.
 Sharma M, Nair DT. Pfprex from Plasmodium falciparum can bypass oxidative stress-induced DNA lesions. FEBS J. 2022 Sep;289(17):5218-5240. doi: 10.1111/febs.16414. Epub 2022 Mar 11. PMID: 35220686.
 Bhatia S, Narayanan N, Nagpal S, Nair DT. Antiviral therapeutics directed against RNA dependent RNA polymerases from positive-sense viruses. Mol Aspects Med. 2021 Oct;81:101005. doi: 10.1016/j.mam.2021.101005. Epub 2021 Jul 24. PMID: 34311994.
 Nagpal S, Nair DT. The PHP domain of PolX from Staphylococcus aureus aids high fidelity DNA synthesis through the removal of misincorporated deoxyribo-, ribo- and oxidized nucleotides. Sci Rep. 2021 Feb 18;11(1):4178. doi: 10.1038/s41598-021-83498-1. PMID: 33603016; PMCID: PMC7893174.
 Narayanan N, Nair DT. Ritonavir may inhibit exoribonuclease activity of nsp14 from the SARS-CoV-2 virus and potentiate the activity of chain terminating drugs. Int J Biol Macromol. 2021 Jan 31;168:272-278. doi: 10.1016/j.ijbiomac.2020.12.038. Epub 2020 Dec 9. PMID: 33309661; PMCID: PMC7724963.
 Narayanan N, Nair DT. Vitamin B12 may inhibit RNA-dependent-RNA polymerase activity of nsp12 from the SARS-CoV-2 virus. IUBMB Life. 2020 Oct;72(10):2112-2120. doi: 10.1002/iub.2359. Epub 2020 Aug 18. PMID: 32812340; PMCID: PMC7461454.
 Sharma M, Narayanan N, Nair DT. The proofreading activity of Pfprex from Plasmodium falciparum can prevent mutagenesis of the apicoplast genome by oxidized nucleotides. Sci Rep. 2020 Jul 7;10(1):11157. doi: 10.1038/s41598-020-67853-2. PMID: 32636411; PMCID: PMC7341739.
 Jain A, Kumar A, Shikhi M, Kumar A, Nair DT, Salunke DM. The structure of MP-4 from Mucuna pruriens at 2.22 Å resolution. Acta Crystallogr F Struct Biol Commun. 2020 Feb 1;76(Pt 2):47-57. doi: 10.1107/S2053230X20000199. Epub 2020 Feb 3. PMID: 32039885; PMCID: PMC7010354.
 Narayanan N, Banerjee A, Jain D, Kulkarni DS, Sharma R, Nirwal S, Rao DN, Nair DT. Tetramerization at Low pH Licenses DNA Methylation Activity of M.HpyAXI in the Presence of Acid Stress. J Mol Biol. 2020 Jan 17;432(2):324-342. doi: 10.1016/j.jmb.2019.10.001. Epub 2019 Oct 16. PMID: 31628946.
 Narayanan N, Banerjee A, Jain D, Kulkarni DS, Sharma R, Nirwal S, Rao DN, Nair DT. Tetramerization at Low pH Licenses DNA Methylation Activity of M.HpyAXI in the Presence of Acid Stress. J Mol Biol. 2020 Jan 17;432(2):324-342.
 

 
 
 
 
 
 
 
 
 
 
 
 
 Weinert T, Olieric V, Waltersperger S, Panepucci E, Chen L, Zhang H, Zhou D, Rose J, Ebihara A, Kuramitsu S, Li D, Howe N, Schnapp G, Pautsch A, Bargsten K, Prota AE, Surana P, Kottur J, Nair DT, Basilico F, Cecatiello V, Pasqualato S, Boland A, Weichenrieder O, Wang BC, Steinmetz MO, Caffrey M, Wang M. Fast native-SAD phasing for routine macromolecular structure determination. Nat Methods. 2015 Feb;12(2):131-3. doi: 10.1038/nmeth.3211. Epub 2014 Dec 15. Erratum in: Nat Methods. 2015 Jul;12(7):692. .
 Kottur J, Sharma A, Gore KR, Narayanan N, Samanta B, Pradeepkumar PI, Nair DT. Unique structural features in DNA polymerase IV enable efficient bypass of the N2 adduct induced by the nitrofurazone antibiotic. Structure. 2015 Jan 6;23(1):56–67. doi: 10.1016/j.str.2014.10.019. Epub 2014 Dec 11. .
 Surana P, Satchidanandam V, Nair DT. RNA-dependent RNA polymerase of Japanese encephalitis virus binds the initiator nucleotide GTP to form a mechanistically important pre-initiation state. Nucleic Acids Res. 2014 Feb;42(4):2758-73. doi: 10.1093/nar/gkt1106. Epub 2013 Nov 28. ; .
 Sharma A, Kottur J, Narayanan N, Nair DT. A strategically located serine residue is critical for the mutator activity of DNA polymerase IV from Escherichia coli. Nucleic Acids Res. 2013 May;41(9):5104-14. doi: 10.1093/nar/gkt146. Epub 2013 Mar 21. ; .
 Jain D, Nair DT. Spacing between core recognition motifs determines relative orientation of AraR monomers on bipartite operators. Nucleic Acids Res. 2013 Jan 7;41(1):639-47. doi: 10.1093/nar/gks962. Epub 2012 Oct 29. ; .
 Sharma A, Subramanian V, Nair DT. The PAD region in the mycobacterial DinB homologue MsPolIV exhibits positional heterogeneity. Acta Crystallogr D Biol Crystallogr. 2012 Aug;68(Pt 8):960-7. doi: 10.1107/S0907444912017623. Epub 2012 Jul 17. .
 Sharma A, Nair DT. MsDpo4-a DinB Homolog from Mycobacterium smegmatis-Is an Error-Prone DNA Polymerase That Can Promote G:T and T:G Mismatches. J Nucleic Acids. 2012;2012:285481. doi: 10.1155/2012/285481. Epub 2012 Mar 15. ; .
 Sharma A, Nair DT. Cloning, expression, purification, crystallization and preliminary crystallographic analysis of MsDpo4: a Y-family DNA polymerase from Mycobacterium smegmatis. Acta Crystallogr Sect F Struct Biol Cryst Commun. 2011 Jul 1;67(Pt 7):812-6. doi: 10.1107/S1744309111019063. Epub 2011 Jun 30. ; .
 Nair DT, Johnson RE, Prakash L, Prakash S, Aggarwal AK. DNA synthesis across an abasic lesion by yeast REV1 DNA polymerase. J Mol Biol. 2011 Feb 11;406(1):18–28. doi: 10.1016/j.jmb.2010.12.016. Epub 2010 Dec 15. ; .
 Namadurai S, Jain D, Kulkarni DS, Tabib CR, Friedhoff P, Rao DN, Nair DT. The C-terminal domain of the MutL homolog from Neisseria gonorrhoeae forms an inverted homodimer. PLoS One. 2010 Oct 28;5(10):e13726. doi: 10.1371/journal.pone.0013726. ; .
 Jain R, Nair DT, Johnson RE, Prakash L, Prakash S, Aggarwal AK. Replication across template T/U by human DNA polymerase-iota. Structure. 2009 Jul 15;17(7):974-80. doi: 10.1016/j.str.2009.04.011. ; .
 Nair DT, Johnson RE, Prakash L, Prakash S, Aggarwal AK. DNA synthesis across an abasic lesion by human DNA polymerase iota. Structure. 2009 Apr 15;17(4):530-7. doi: 10.1016/j.str.2009.02.015. ; .
 Gupta YK, Nair DT, Wharton RP, Aggarwal AK. Structures of human Pumilio with noncognate RNAs reveal molecular mechanisms for binding promiscuity. Structure. 2008 Apr;16(4):549-57. doi: 10.1016/j.str.2008.01.006. Epub 2008 Mar 6. .
 Nair DT, Johnson RE, Prakash L, Prakash S, Aggarwal AK. Protein-template-directed synthesis across an acrolein-derived DNA adduct by yeast Rev1 DNA polymerase. Structure. 2008 Feb;16(2):239-45. doi: 10.1016/j.str.2007.12.009. .
 Lone S, Townson SA, Uljon SN, Johnson RE, Brahma A, Nair DT, Prakash S, Prakash L, Aggarwal AK. Human DNA polymerase kappa encircles DNA: implications for mismatch extension and lesion bypass. Mol Cell. 2007 Feb 23;25(4):601-14. .
 Nair DT, Johnson RE, Prakash L, Prakash S, Aggarwal AK. Hoogsteen base pair formation promotes synthesis opposite the 1,N6-ethenodeoxyadenosine lesion by human DNA polymerase iota. Nat Struct Mol Biol. 2006 Jul;13(7):619-25. Epub 2006 2 July .
 Nair DT, Johnson RE, Prakash L, Prakash S, Aggarwal AK. An incoming nucleotide imposes an anti to syn conformational change on the templating purine in the human DNA polymerase-iota active site. Structure. 2006 Apr;14(4):749-55. .
 Nair DT, Johnson RE, Prakash L, Prakash S, Aggarwal AK. Human DNA polymerase iota incorporates dCTP opposite template G via a G.C + Hoogsteen base pair. Structure. 2005 Oct;13(10):1569–77. .
 Nair DT, Johnson RE, Prakash L, Prakash S, Aggarwal AK. Rev1 employs a novel mechanism of DNA synthesis using a protein template. Science. 2005 Sep 30;309(5744):2219-22. .
 Nair DT, Johnson RE, Prakash S, Prakash L, Aggarwal AK. Replication by human DNA polymerase-iota occurs by Hoogsteen base-pairing. Nature. 2004 Jul 15;430(6997):377-80. .
 Nair DT, Kaur KJ, Singh K, Mukherjee P, Rajagopal D, George A, Bal V, Rath S, Rao KV, Salunke DM. Mimicry of native peptide antigens by the corresponding retro-inverso analogs is dependent on their intrinsic structure and interaction propensities. J Immunol. 2003 Feb 1;170(3):1362–73. .
 Nair DT, Singh K, Siddiqui Z, Nayak BP, Rao KV, Salunke DM. Epitope recognition by diverse antibodies suggests conformational convergence in an antibody response. J Immunol. 2002 Mar 1;168(5):2371-82. .
 Jain D, Nair DT, Swaminathan GJ, Abraham EG, Nagaraju J, Salunke DM. Structure of the induced antibacterial protein from tasar silkworm, Antheraea mylitta. Implications to molecular evolution. J Biol Chem. 2001 Nov 2;276(44):41377-82. Epub 2001 Aug 24. .
 Nayak SK, Bagga S, Gaur D, Nair DT, Salunke DM, Batra JK. Mechanism of specific target recognition and RNA hydrolysis by ribonucleolytic toxin restrictocin. Biochemistry. 2001 Aug 7;40(31):9115-24. .
 Nair DT, Singh K, Sahu N, Rao KV, Salunke DM. Crystal structure of an antibody bound to an immunodominant peptide epitope: novel features in peptide-antibody recognition. J Immunol. 2000 Dec 15;165(12):6949-55. .

 See also

 Genome
 Molecular self-assembly

Notes

References

External links 
 
 
 "Deepak T Nair at RCB "https://www.rcb.res.in/index.php?param=empdetails/129
https://indianexpress.com/article/technology/science/from-the-lab-why-some-bacteria-multiply-in-certain-set-ups-and-resist-antibiotics-4881283/
SSB Award Presentation Ceremony: https://www.youtube.com/watch?v=hBOn23gwGkI
Science Setu ID75  seminar: https://www.youtube.com/watch?v=YfnJ4mh6y6s

Recipients of the Shanti Swarup Bhatnagar Award in Biological Science
Indian medical academics
Indian scientific authors
1973 births
Living people
Scientists from Kerala
N-BIOS Prize recipients
Savitribai Phule Pune University alumni
Icahn School of Medicine at Mount Sinai alumni
Academic staff of the National Centre for Biological Sciences
Malayali people
Indian biotechnologists
Indian molecular biologists